Frank Carl Kudelka (June 25, 1925 – May 4, 1993), nicknamed Apples, was an American National Basketball Association (NBA) player. In his first two years at Saint Mary's College of California, Kudelka averaged 18.1 points per game. Once the shotclock was introduced to college basketball in his junior season, Frank averaged 20.4 points per game. He was the nation's fourth leading scorer. As a senior at Saint Mary's, Frank averaged 16.2 points per game.  He was also named an All-American basketball player by the Helms Foundation after his senior season.  Frank made his NBA debut in the 1949-50 NBA season for the Chicago Stags. In his first NBA season, Frank averaged 6.7 points and 2.0 assists per game. Frank played four seasons in the NBA with the Stags, Washington Capitols, Boston Celtics, Baltimore Bullets and Philadelphia Warriors. In his NBA career, Frank averaged 7.2 points, 3.2 rebounds, and 2.1 assists per game.

NBA career statistics

Regular season

Playoffs

References

1925 births
1993 deaths
All-American college men's basketball players
American men's basketball players
Baltimore Bullets (1944–1954) players
Basketball players from California
Boston Celtics players
Chicago Stags players
Philadelphia Warriors players
Saint Mary's Gaels men's basketball players
Shooting guards
Small forwards
Undrafted National Basketball Association players
Washington Capitols players